Ngô Thị Doãn Thanh (born 28 October 1957 in Hanoi) is a Vietnamese politician. Ngô Thị Doãn Thanh was Chairman of the Hanoi People's Council from 2006 to 2015. And is member of the Central Executive of the 11th Central Committee of the Communist Party of Vietnam. Ngô Thị Doãn Thanh officially became member of the Communist Party of Vietnam on December 6, 1985. She is also a teacher in the Department of Chemistry, Hanoi University of Pedagogy II.

Ngô Thị Doãn Thanh also served as the Group Secretary, a member of the Central Standing Committee of the Union, former Secretary of the District Party Committee, People's Council Chairman Thanh Xuan District. Deputy Party Secretary and Vice Chairman of the city People's Council before becoming Chairman of the Hanoi People's Council.

References

1957 births
Communist Party of Vietnam politicians
Living people
Members of the 11th Central Committee of the Communist Party of Vietnam